"Do You Remember?" is a song performed by Phil Collins released in 1990 as one of the singles from his album ...But Seriously. It was produced by Collins and Hugh Padgham and features singer-songwriter Stephen Bishop on the track as a backing vocalist. The song had minor success in European countries but went to number one on both the Canadian and US Adult Contemporary charts. It also peaked at number four on the US Billboard Hot 100, becoming his 14th and last top-ten hit.

A live performance of the song appears on the Serious Hits... Live! album. The live version was released as a single in Australia and Europe, where it reached number 57 on the UK Singles Chart and the top 30 in Belgium, France, Ireland and the Netherlands. Music videos were produced for both versions; a live version, using the Serious Hits... Live! album recording was published on Phil Collins' YouTube channel in June 2010 while the original video using the studio version wasn't published on his YouTube channel until July 2018.

The song's lyrics are from the perspective of a man whose relationship is failing, due to his lover's neglect.
An instrumental cover performed by the Royal Philharmonic Orchestra was released later. It was extremely popular in Bulgaria during the early 1990s, due to a then-famous teenage TV program using it while showing its closing credits. The song was also featured in the United States Army aviation action movie Fire Birds starring Nicolas Cage and Sean Young.

Formats and track listings
7" single 
"Do You Remember?"
"I Wish It Would Rain Down" (Demo)

CD maxi
"Do You Remember?" (Live)
"Against All Odds (Take a Look at Me Now)" (Live)
"Doesn't Anybody Stay Together Anymore?" (Live)
"Inside Out" (Live)

CD maxi - Caroussel boxset
"Do You Remember?" (Live)
"Doesn't Anybody Stay Together Anymore?" (Live)
"The Roof Is Leaking" (Live)

7" single
"Do You Remember?" (Live) – 5:47
"Against All Odds (Take a Look at Me Now)" (Live) – 3:32

12" single
"Do You Remember?" (Live) – 5:47
"Against All Odds (Take a Look at Me Now)" (Live) – 3:32
"Doesn't Anybody Stay Together Anymore" (Live) – 5:52

Music video
The music video opens on Collins finishing up performing the song in the recording studio when his engineer alerts him of a phone call. Collins picks up the phone amid a loud lightning and thunder storm, unable to hear the person on the other line. He then hears and sees a woman-like figure through a door calling for him. He opens the door and is blinded by a bright light and glass shattering, which presumably transports him back to his childhood and the video to black and white. The song begins to play as the childhood sequence, interspersed with the adult Collins singing to "Remember", tells the story of a young newspaper boy becoming acquainted with a girl classmate. The two become romantically involved before the girl tells him that she is moving. As the two bid goodbye, the boy gives her his hat and watches despairingly as her and her family drive away. The video cuts back to exactly how it began, only this time Collins says to his engineer, "Can we take a message?"

Personnel
Phil Collins – vocals, keyboards, percussion, drum machine
Daryl Stuermer – guitar
Pino Palladino – bass
Stephen Bishop – backing vocals

Charts

Original version

Weekly charts

Year-end charts

Live version

References

1990 singles
1991 singles
Phil Collins songs
Live singles
Songs written by Phil Collins
Rock ballads
RPM Top Singles number-one singles
Song recordings produced by Hugh Padgham
Song recordings produced by Phil Collins
1989 songs
Atlantic Records singles
Virgin Records singles
Warner Music Group singles